The canton of La Piège au Razès is an administrative division of the Aude department, southern France. It was created at the French canton reorganisation which came into effect in March 2015. Its seat is in Bram.

It consists of the following communes:
 
Alaigne
Baraigne
Belflou
Bellegarde-du-Razès
Belpech
Belvèze-du-Razès
Bram
Brézilhac
Brugairolles
Cahuzac
Cailhau
Cailhavel
Cambieure
La Cassaigne
Cazalrenoux
La Courtète
Cumiès
Donazac
Escueillens-et-Saint-Just-de-Bélengard
Fajac-la-Relenque
Fanjeaux
Fenouillet-du-Razès
Ferran
Fonters-du-Razès
La Force
Gaja-la-Selve
Generville
Gourvieille
Gramazie
Hounoux
Lafage
Lasserre-de-Prouille
Laurabuc
Laurac
Lauraguel
Lignairolles
La Louvière-Lauragais
Malviès
Marquein
Mayreville
Mazerolles-du-Razès
Mézerville
Mireval-Lauragais
Molandier
Molleville
Montauriol
Montgradail
Monthaut
Orsans
Payra-sur-l'Hers
Pech-Luna
Pécharic-et-le-Py
Pexiora
Peyrefitte-sur-l'Hers
Plaigne
Plavilla
Pomy
Ribouisse
Routier
Saint-Amans
Sainte-Camelle
Saint-Gaudéric
Saint-Julien-de-Briola
Saint-Michel-de-Lanès
Saint-Sernin
Salles-sur-l'Hers
Seignalens
Villarzel-du-Razès
Villasavary
Villautou
Villepinte
Villesiscle

References

Cantons of Aude